The Constitution of the Commonwealth of the Northern Mariana Islands is the governing document of the United States Commonwealth of the Northern Mariana Islands ("CNMI"). Its creation was required by the covenant between the United States and the CNMI. It was drafted at a local constitutional convention in 1976, approved by territorial voters on March 6, 1977, and became effective January 9, 1978.

References

External links 

 The constitution from the Commonwealth's Law Review Commission

Government of the Northern Mariana Islands
Constitutions of country subdivisions